The red-fronted tinkerbird, (Pogoniulus pusillus) is a small African barbet. Barbets are near-passerine birds with bristles around the base of the bill. They have a world-wide tropical distribution.

The red-fronted tinkerbird is a widespread and frequently common resident breeder in eastern South Africa, with a separate population from southern Sudan and Ethiopia south to central and eastern Tanzania. It is sometimes considered conspecific with its northern counterpart, the yellow-fronted tinkerbird, Pogoniulus chrysoconus.

The red-fronted tinkerbird is associated with juniper forest and scrub. It nests in a tree hole and lays two or three eggs. It eats berries and fruit, particularly mistletoe, but also takes insects as it forages in deep cover.

It is a plump bird, with a short neck, large head, and short tail. The adult has black upper parts heavily streaked with yellow and white, and a golden wing patch. Its head has a strong black and white pattern, with a red forecrown spot. Its underparts and rump are lemon yellow. Sexes are similar in appearance, but young birds lack the red forehead.

This species is distinguished from the yellow-fronted tinkerbird by the colour of the forehead spot, the golden wing patch, and its overall darker appearance. It is often confused with the red-fronted barbet, but it is significantly smaller than that species, has a black moustache and a less robust bill, and lacks a broad yellow superciliary stripe.

At about 100 repetitions per minute, the red-fronted tinkerbird's call is a fast tink-tink-tink-tink, very similar to that of the yellow-fronted tinkerbird. Many barbets perch prominently, but unlike their larger relatives, the smaller tinkerbirds sing from cover and are more frequently heard than seen.

References

 Sinclair, Hockey and Tarboton, SASOL Birds of Southern Africa,

External links

 Red-fronted tinkerbird - Species text in The Atlas of Southern African Birds
 Kenya birds

red-fronted tinkerbird
Birds of East Africa
Birds of Southern Africa
red-fronted tinkerbird
red-fronted tinkerbird